Rolf Wallin (born 7 September 1957) is a Norwegian composer, trumpeter and avant-garde performance artist.

Biography 
Wallin was born in Oslo, where he studied with Finn Mortensen and Olav Anton Thommessen. He later studied at the University of California where his teachers included Roger Reynolds and Vinko Globokar. Wallin’s music combines an intuitive freedom with a rigorous mathematical approach, such as use of fractal algorithms to construct melody and harmony, resulting in a music that often hints at the influence of Ligeti, Xenakis and Berio.

In 1998 he was awarded the Nordic Council Music Prize.

Career highlights 

 1976–82 – studied at the Norwegian State Academy of Music.
 1987 – Norwegian Society of Composers Award for …though what made it has gone.
 1991 – developed ‘crystal chord’ technique for generation of harmony in ning.
 1998 – awarded Nordic Council Music Prize for Clarinet Concerto.
 2000 – portrait CD Boyl released on Aurora label; wins Norwegian Spelemann prisen.
 2001 – featured composer at Stockholm International Composer Festival.

Key works 

 …though what made it has gone (1987; mezzo-soprano, piano)
 Stonewave (1990; percussion)
 Boyl (1995; chamber ensemble)
 Concerto for Clarinet and Orchestra (1996)
 Ground (1996; cello, strings)
 Act (2004; orchestra)
 Strange News (2007; actor; orchestra; video-projection; electronics)

Selected recordings 
 Act; Das war schön!; Tides – Ondine ODE 1118-2
 Boyl; Concerto for Clarinet and Orchestra; Concerto for Timpani and Orchestra; Ground – Aurora ACD 5011
 Solve et coagula; ning; Stonewave; …though what made it has gone – Hemera HCD 2903
 Phonotope I – Aurora ACD 5035

References

External links 
 Rolf Wallin's homepage at Chester Music
 Personal homepage

1957 births
21st-century classical composers
Living people
Norwegian classical composers
International Rostrum of Composers prize-winners
Spellemannprisen winners
Norwegian male classical composers
21st-century Norwegian male musicians